The Henderson-Stewart Baronetcy, of Callumshill in the County of Perth, is a title in the Baronetage of the United Kingdom. It was created on 28 March 1957 for James Henderson-Stewart, Member of Parliament for East Fife from 1933 to 1961 and Joint Under-Secretary of State for Scotland from 1952 to 1957. As of 2010, the title is held by his son, the second Baronet, who succeeded in 1961.

Henderson-Stewart baronets, of Callumshill (1957)
Sir James Henderson-Stewart, 1st Baronet (1897–1961)
Sir David James Henderson-Stewart, 2nd Baronet (born 1941)

Notes

References
Kidd, Charles, Williamson, David (editors). Debrett's Peerage and Baronetage (1990 edition). New York: St Martin's Press, 1990, 

Henderson-Stewart